A. Rajagopal is a well-known Indian politician, social worker, lawyer and former Member of the Legislative Assembly. He was elected to the Tamil Nadu legislative assembly as a Tamil Maanila Congress (Moopanar) candidate from Sivakasi constituency in 2001 election.

References 

Tamil Nadu politicians
Living people
Year of birth missing (living people)
Tamil Maanila Congress politicians